Édouard Batiste (28 March 1820 – 9 November 1876) was a French composer and organist.

Career
Batiste was born in Paris and studied at the Conservatory as a teenager, winning prizes in solfège, harmony and accompaniment, counterpoint and fugue, and organ. In 1840, he won the Prix de Rome together with François Bazin.

In 1842, he became the organist at the church of Saint-Nicolas-des-Champs in Paris, where he remained for twelve years, before becoming organist at Saint-Eustache Church. While at Saint-Eustache, he performed the organ in the premiere of Hector Berlioz's Te Deum in April 1855, conducted by the composer.

He died in Paris aged 56.

His students included Edward Morris Bowman and Joseph Lennon.

References

External links
 
 

1820 births
1876 deaths
Musicians from Paris
19th-century classical composers
19th-century French composers
19th-century French male musicians
Burials at Père Lachaise Cemetery
French classical organists
French male composers
French male organists
Prix de Rome for composition
Male classical organists
19th-century organists